Michal Bárta (born 23 December 1989) is a Czech football player who plays for 1. SK Prostějov.

External links
 Guardian Football
 

1989 births
Living people
Czech footballers
Association football goalkeepers
SK Sigma Olomouc players
FK Čáslav players
SK Líšeň players
FC Baník Ostrava players
SK Dynamo České Budějovice players
FK Jablonec players
Bohemians 1905 players
FK Fotbal Třinec players
FK Frýdek-Místek players
FK Slavoj Trebišov players
1. SK Prostějov players
2. Liga (Slovakia) players
Czech First League players
Czech expatriate sportspeople in Slovakia
Expatriate footballers in Slovakia
People from Chlumec nad Cidlinou
Sportspeople from the Hradec Králové Region